"Tonight's the Night (Gonna Be Alright)" is a song written by Rod Stewart, and recorded at Muscle Shoals Sound Studio in Sheffield, Alabama for his 1976 album A Night on the Town. The song, controversial at the time of release, proved to be a massive commercial success and became his second US chart topper on the Billboard Hot 100. It made its debut at number 81 on 2 October 1976 and rose quickly, climbing from number eight to the top of the chart on 13 November 1976, and remained on top for eight consecutive weeks until 8 January 1977. It was the longest stay of any song during 1976, the longest run at the top for a single in the US in over eight years (since the Beatles’ "Hey Jude" in November 1968), and the longest stay at number one for Rod Stewart in his entire recording career, and the final number one of the US Bicentennial year. The song also peaked at No. 5 in the UK, No. 1 for six weeks in Canada, No. 3 in Australia and charted well in other parts of the world. It was the number 1 song on both Billboards 1977 year-end chart and the year-end Canadian singles chart. It became the best-selling single of 1977 in the United States. As of 2018, it is the 19th-most popular song in the history of the chart.

Background and lyrics
According to Dan Peek of America, Stewart's inspiration for "Tonight's the Night" was America's Top 30 hit "Today's the Day": Peek recalls that one evening when he and his guest Rod Stewart were playing together in Peek's home recording studio: "I played 'Today's the Day', the song I had been working on. Rod said that he liked it and that it gave him an idea for a song. Of course after his recording of 'Tonight's the Night' came out I laughed when I remembered what he'd said. I'm sure I probably smacked my forehead and said: 'Why didn't I think of that?'"

The song features a French spoken part from Britt Ekland who was Stewart's girlfriend at the time. While primarily recorded at Muscle Shoals, the final vocal was recorded at Caribou Ranch studios, where Stewart, Ekland and producer Tom Dowd spent several days. The high-altitude result was a vocal an octave higher than "sea-based" versions.  Some radio stations play edits of the song, shortening the coda, as well as the whispers, because they were deemed to be too suggestive for airplay, where the songs could be banned from being played on the air.

The saxophone solo is by Jerry Jumonville.

Record World said that "Here Stewart's as relaxed and moving as he can be."

Chart performance

Weekly charts

Year-end charts

All-time charts

Certifications

Cover versions
In 1993, Stewart recorded a live version of the song during his session for MTV Unplugged. This version was included on the album Unplugged...and Seated.

The song has been remade by such artists as: Linda Clifford, Nicky Moore, and sung by Anthony Kavanagh, Terry Steele, who reached number forty-four on the R&B singles chart, and Alison Crawford on Grease is the Word.

A version by Roy Head reached the top 30 in USA and Canada in 1978.

In Janet Jackson's cover, the lyrics imply that she and her partner are about to share a threesome with another woman. Jackson begins the song by saying, "This is just between me and you...and you."  Additionally, each chorus addresses a different person, as she sings, "'Cause I love you, boy" in one and "'Cause I love you, girl" in another. "She even makes a bid for gay icon status…" wrote Neil McCormick in The Daily Telegraph'''s review of The Velvet Rope'', "climaxing (if that's the right word) with a bizarre lesbian reinterpretation of Rod Stewart's 'Tonight's the Night'."

References

1976 songs
1976 singles
Billboard Hot 100 number-one singles
Cashbox number-one singles
Music videos directed by Bruce Gowers
Rod Stewart songs
Song recordings produced by Tom Dowd
Songs written by Rod Stewart
Riva Records singles
Warner Records singles
Bisexuality-related songs